Skifska is a license block located in the Ukrainian zone on the continental shelf of the Black Sea. It was awarded in 2012 to a consortium consisting of Royal Dutch Shell, ExxonMobil, Petrom and Nadra. 

Royal Dutch Shell stopped their negotiations over a production sharing agreement in January 2014.  Due to the 2014 Crimean crisis the project was put on hold in March 2014.

References

Natural gas fields in Ukraine
Black Sea energy
Economy of Crimea
ExxonMobil oil and gas fields
Shell plc oil and gas fields